Leonardo da Vinci's fighting vehicle is one of the conceptions of the revered Italian polymath and artist Leonardo da Vinci.

Design 
The concept was designed while Leonardo da Vinci was under the patronage of Ludovico Sforza in 1487. Sometimes described as a prototype of modern tanks, Leonardo's armored vehicle represented a conical cover inspired by a turtle's shell. The covering was to be made of wood and reinforced with metal plates that add to the thickness. Slanting angles would deflect enemy fire. The machine was powered by two large cranks operated internally by four strong men. The vehicle was equipped with an array of light cannons, placed around the perimeter.The gears of the design were located in a reversed order, making the vehicle unworkable. This is thought by some sources to have been a deliberate mistake by Leonardo as a form of security, in case his design was stolen and used irresponsibly. It is almost impossible to fix this problem successfully without taking away power from its forward movement and strength. Regardless, the vehicle would have been too heavy to move and would have lacked the battlefield mobility seen in modern tanks that make them so effective.

The armored vehicle was designed to intimidate the enemy rather than to be used as a serious military weapon. Due to the vehicle's impressive size, it would not be capable of moving on rugged terrain. The project could hardly be applied and realized in the 15th century.

Around 2010, a group of engineers recreated Leonardo's vehicle, based on the original design, and fixed the mistake in gearing.

References

External links 
 Leonardo da Vinci's inventions
 Studies of military tank-like machines; including one at top with horses pulling a contraption with revolving scythes Pen and brown ink, The British Museum, Item number 1860,0616.99.

Leonardo da Vinci projects
Military vehicles